Quantifier may refer to:

 Quantifier (linguistics), an indicator of quantity
 Quantifier (logic)
 Quantification (science)

See also
Quantification (disambiguation)